Salt-rising (or salt-risen) bread is a dense white bread that is traditional in the Appalachian Mountains, leavened by naturally occurring Clostridium perfringens and other bacteria rather than by yeast. Salt-rising bread is made from wheat flour; a starter consisting of either water or milk and corn, potatoes, or wheat; and minor ingredients such as salt and sugar.

Salt in the name is a misnomer; the bread is not leavened by salt nor does it taste salty. One explanation for the name of the bread is that the starter was kept warm in a bed of heated salt. Another possible origin of the name is the use of salt to inhibit yeast growth and provide an environment more conducive for the microbes to grow, enhancing the distinct flavors which predominate over the more typical yeast flavors.

Salt-rising bread is denser, with a closer grain, than yeast-leavened bread, and has a distinctive taste and odor. The pungent odor of the fermenting starter has been described as similar to "very ripe cheese".

History
The exact origin of this bread is unknown, but evidence suggests that it was the pioneer women in early American states who discovered how to make bread this way. Commercial yeast was not available until the 1860s. Currently, the tradition of making salt-rising bread is kept alive by relatively few individuals and bakeries that tend to be clustered in the central to eastern United States. It is particularly popular in Kentucky, West Virginia, Southern Tier of New York, Western Pennsylvania and pockets in Michigan.

Bacteria
One of the main rising agents, the bacterium Clostridium perfringens, is a common cause of food poisoning and can cause enteritis necroticans (pig-bel disease) and gas gangrene. Although disease-causing strains of C. perfringens have been isolated from salt-rising breads, there is no indication of salt-rising bread having ever caused any human disease. The baking process appears to reduce bacteria to safe levels.

References

External links
 Brown, Susan Ray "The Salt Rising Bread Project "http://www.saltrisingbread.net/
 

Breads
American breads